Candlewick Lake is an unincorporated, gated community in Boone County, Illinois, United States. Candlewick Lake is located between Poplar Grove and Timberlane; the community includes a lake with the same name. It is part of the Rockford, Illinois Metropolitan Statistical Area.

The gated community also features a community pool, beach, recreation center, emergency rescue squad center, parks & dog parks, walking trails, golf course, tennis courts, Bar & Grill (In Savannah Oaks), and restaurant.

Savannah Oaks Bar & Grill and golf course are located within the gates of Candlewick Lake in the northern region.

Water source provided by Aqua Illinois. Privatized water corporation. Residents currently fighting to remove.

Demographics

References

Census-designated places in Boone County, Illinois
Census-designated places in Illinois
Rockford metropolitan area, Illinois
Unincorporated communities in Boone County, Illinois
Unincorporated communities in Illinois